The legislative districts of Misamis Occidental are the representations of the province of Misamis Occidental in the various national legislatures of the Philippines. The province is currently represented in the lower house of the Congress of the Philippines through its first and second congressional districts.

History 

Prior to gaining separate representation, areas now under the jurisdiction of Misamis Occidental were represented under the historical Misamis Province (1907–1931).

The approval of Act No. 3537 on November 2, 1929 split the old province into Misamis Occidental and Misamis Oriental, and provided the new provinces separate representations in the Philippine Assembly. The new province of Misamis Occidental first elected its own representative in the 1931 elections. It also remained part of the eleventh senatorial district which elected two out of the 24-member upper house of the Philippine Legislature when senators were still elected from territory-based districts (1916–1935).

During the Second World War, the Province of Misamis Occidental sent two delegates to the National Assembly of the Japanese-sponsored Second Philippine Republic: one was the provincial governor (an ex officio member), while the other was elected through a provincial assembly of KALIBAPI members during the Japanese occupation of the Philippines. Upon the restoration of the Philippine Commonwealth in 1945 the province retained its pre-war lone district.

Even after receiving their own city charters, Ozamiz, Tangub and Oroquieta remained part of the representation of the Province of Misamis Occidental by virtue of Section 89 of Republic Act No. 321 (June 19, 1948), Section 88 of Republic Act No. 5131 (June 17, 1967), and Section 106 of Republic Act No. 5518 (June 21, 1969), respectively.

Misamis Occidental was represented in the Interim Batasang Pambansa as part of Region X from 1978 to 1984. The province returned one representative, elected at large, to the Regular Batasang Pambansa in 1984.

Under the new Constitution which was proclaimed on February 11, 1987, the province was reapportioned into two congressional districts; each elected its member to the restored House of Representatives starting that same year.

1st District 
City: Oroquieta
Municipalities: Aloran, Baliangao, Calamba, Concepcion, Jimenez, Lopez Jaena, Panaon, Plaridel, Sapang Dalaga
Population (2020): 276,944

Notes

2nd District 
Cities: Ozamiz, Tangub
Municipalities: Bonifacio, Clarin, Don Victoriano Chiongbian, Sinacaban, Tudela
Population (2020): 340,571

Notes

Lone District (defunct) 

 includes the cities of Ozamiz (chartered 1948), Tangub (chartered 1967) and Oroquieta (chartered 1969)  

Notes

At-Large (defunct)

1943-1944

1984-1986

See also 
Legislative districts of Misamis

References 

Misamis Occidental
Politics of Misamis Occidental